The Internazionali di Tennis Città di Perugia (formerly known as the Blue Panorama Airlines Tennis Cup and Blu-Express.com Tennis Cup) is a tennis tournament held in Perugia, Italy since 2015. The event is part of the ATP Challenger Tour and is played on outdoor clay courts.

Past finals

Singles

Doubles

References

External links 
 

 
ATP Challenger Tour
Clay court tennis tournaments
Tennis tournaments in Italy